Nathaniel Fein (August 7, 1914 – September 26, 2000) was a photographer for the New York Herald Tribune for 33 years. Fein is known for photographing Babe Ruth towards the end of his life, winning the 1949 Pulitzer Prize for his photograph "The Babe Bows Out."

Life

Fein was born and raised on the Lower East Side of Manhattan. He was a press photographer at the New York Herald Tribune from 1933 to 1966. Albert Einstein, Ty Cobb, Queen Elizabeth and Harry S. Truman were among the many public figures that he photographed. He won more press photo awards than any of his contemporaries. Although considered to be one of the greatest human interest photographers in journalism, he carried the distinction of having taken "the most celebrated photograph in sports history." (The New York Times, 1992). Fein's Babe Ruth image was the first sports picture to win a Pulitzer Prize.

A resident of Tappan, New York, Fein died on September 26, 2000, at the age of 86.

Babe Ruth

In 1948, Fein took the photograph that was titled "The Babe Bows Out," which was awarded the Pulitzer Prize for Photography.

Other subjects
Known for setting a scene correctly, he would climb buildings and bridges to get the shot he was after.  Fein's main subject matter was New York following World War II.

Fein also photographed notables Dwight D. Eisenhower, Omar Bradley, William Westmoreland, Eleanor Roosevelt, Albert Einstein, Albert Schweitzer, Marilyn Monroe and Carl Sandburg.

References

External links
"Nat Fein", Google Images

1914 births
20th-century American photographers
American portrait photographers
2000 deaths
Pulitzer Prize for Photography winners
20th-century American non-fiction writers
People from Tappan, New York